Brunei Darussalam National Olympic Council (Jawi: , IOC code: BRU) is the National Olympic Committee representing Brunei. It is also the body responsible for Brunei's representation at the Commonwealth Games and the governing body of sports in the country.

See also
Brunei at the Olympics
Brunei at the Commonwealth Games

References

External links
 Official website

Brunei
Brunei
Oly
Brunei at the Olympics
1984 establishments in Brunei
Sports organizations established in 1984